Abraham H. Galloway (February 8, 1837 – September 1, 1870) was an American politician who served as a state Senator in North Carolina. An African American.

Born in Smithville (now Southport, North Carolina) in 1837. A former slave who played an important role in supporting the Union Army's success in North Carolina, he served in the North Carolina Senate during the Reconstruction era following the Civil War. His funeral in Wilmington, North Carolina in 1870 was honored by attendance from more than 6,000 people.

A historical marker in Wilmington was erected in 2012, a project spearheaded by a local committee, now known as the "Friends of Abraham Galloway", as recorded in the Wilmington Journal.

Although he was a driving force in shaping local and state political direction during his brief lifetime, Abraham Galloway left no record of his own thoughts and ideas, being unable to read or write.  William Still, abolitionist and corresponding secretary for the Philadelphia Vigilance Committee, records the escape of Galloway and his friend Richard Eden from Wilmington to Philadelphia, stowed among the cargo of a schooner carrying naval stores: pine tar and turpentine. Due to the hazards of this particular journey, Still counts Galloway and Eden as "classed among the bravest of the brave".  The Vigilance Committee provided passage to Canada for the two men.

Within the 20th century, historians and writers have uncovered Galloway's story, and continue to strengthen knowledge of this Civil War personality through two books, The Watermans Song, published in October 2001, and The Fire of Freedom, published in February 2015. These books bring the story of Abraham Galloway to life.  An article by Phillip Gerard, University of North Carolina-Wilmington, in Our State magazine also highlights his place in the history of North Carolina. Galloway was known as the Scarlet Pimpernel (The Scarlet Pimpernel).

Early life
Abraham Galloway was born to an enslaved black woman, Hester Hankins, who was owned by the widow of a Methodist minister in Smithville (now Southport), North Carolina. His father was John Wesley Galloway, a white ship's pilot. Abraham was owned by the widow's son, Marsden Milton Hankins.  His birth father was protective of his son, despite the circumstances. Hankins allowed the young Galloway to seek brick masonry jobs in Wilmington with the provision that he could bring Hankins 15 dollars a month. Galloway decided to escape when it became impossible for him to continue bringing his owner the 15 dollars. In 1857, at the age of 20, Galloway was able to escape from slavery alongside a fellow slave, Richard Eden. A sympathetic ship captain agreed to hide Galloway and Eden below the deck, among barrels of turpentine, tar, and rosin. Northbound ships were fumigated by burning turpentine, to flush out runaway slaves. Galloway and Eden planned to use oilcloth and wet towels to ward off smoke, but fortunately, the fires were left unlit. Galloway and Eden arrived successfully in Philadelphia, Pennsylvania, but were sent further north to Ontario to avoid bounty hunters. He knew William B. Gould before the war and they reconnected in April 1864 in New York City.

Political leadership
In May 1864 Galloway was part of a delegation of five black leaders who met with Abraham Lincoln and urged him to advocate for suffrage for African Americans. That same year, Galloway was also one of the 144 Black leaders who attended the National Convention of Colored Citizens of the United States, which has been cited as the most important gathering of African-American leaders during the Civil War. By 1865, Galloway had organized a state chapter and five local chapters of the National Equal Rights League. On September 29, 1865, Galloway helped to lead a freed people's convention. He also organized a meeting of 117 Black delegates representing forty-two counties that coincided with a meeting held by the antebellum society.

Wilmington years
Galloway returned to Wilmington, North Carolina's largest city at the time, in Autumn of 1866. He did not follow racial customs, refusing to set aside to let white men pass him on the street or to allow white customers to make purchases ahead of him in shops. He openly carried a pistol. Although illiterate, Galloway was a naturally gifted orator. In his speeches to black audiences, he employed sarcasm and irony when ridiculing whites.

North Carolina's Black Code was passed in 1866, restricting the rights of African Americans. Blacks, however, did see a victory in 1867, when the Reconstruction Acts were passed by the radical congress, which forced the former confederacy to pass Universal Male Suffrage. In September 1867 Galloway delivered a speech promising Wilmington's black men that within six months they would be able to vote on a state constitution that would expand their rights.  Galloway's prominent role at the constitutional convention horrified North Carolina newspapers. The February 4 issue of the Wilmington Daily Post published a story in which black delegates were referred to as "niggers." Galloway demanded that the insult be addressed at the convention. The convention debated whether the term was actually an insult, and when the white reporter confirmed that he had indeed meant it to be an insult he was expelled from the convention. Another convention debate addressed whether black citizens were too easily swayed to vote responsibly. Galloway responded by stating that though his white father's blood was "the best blood in Brunswick County," if he could he would "lance myself and let it out." In March, the front page of multiple Wilmington newspapers reported in dismay that Galloway had met with the white president of the convention in a restaurant and they had shared a public meal together.

The new constitution did nullify the Black Codes and also enabled black candidates for office, but had to be ratified by popular vote. In the same election Galloway ran for the state senate. The Ku Klux Klan mobilized to keep black men away from the polls, and in response Galloway led an informal black militia. The militia patrolled the streets of Wilmington, armed, and confronted white men suspected of Klan membership. On the night of the election, Galloway led several hundred black men "hooting and yelling" through the streets. The Klan did not appear, and both white and black men were able to vote unimpeded. The new constitution was approved, and Galloway elected to the state senate. White politicians claimed voter fraud.

Senator tenure
Galloway was one of three Black senators and 18 Black representatives in the North Carolina General Assembly of 1868–1869. On July 6, 1868, he amended a proposal to desegregate the senate galleries by offering an optional middle section that could be occupied by both races. Galloway was able to vote for ratification of the 14th and 15th amendments to the U.S. Constitution during his tenure. He was also a strong supporter of women's rights.

Death
Galloway died unexpectedly of fever and jaundice on September 1, 1870, in Wilmington. He was 33 years old at the time and had just been reelected to the senate. An estimated 6,000 mourners gathered at his funeral. Frederick Douglass's newspaper, New National Era, stated that Galloway died very poor due to his dedication to philanthropy.

See also

 African-American officeholders during and following the Reconstruction era

References

Works cited

 

1837 births
1870 deaths
North Carolina state senators
19th-century American slaves
19th-century American politicians
American Civil War spies
American stonemasons
African-American suffragists
American suffragists
African-American abolitionists
People from Southport, North Carolina
African-American state legislators in North Carolina
19th-century African-American women